David James Thomas (30 June 1959 – 28 July 2012) was an English cricketer who played for Surrey.

David Thomas was a left-arm medium-fast swing bowler who represented the England Young Cricketers in 1978 and was tipped as a future Test cricketer. He was also a hard-hitting tail-end batsman good enough to score two centuries in first-class cricket.

He played his part in taking Surrey to four Lord's finals between 1979 and 1982. He was awarded the Man of the Match Award for his 3-26 versus Warwickshire in the 1982 NatWest Trophy final which helped Surrey to win the match, and was awarded his county cap during the same season. He claimed 57 first-class wickets in 1983 and 60 in 1984. In 1983 he also came close to 1,000 first-class runs, with 937 at an average of 36.03, scoring two centuries. The closest he came to Test selection was that season, being twelfth man for the Trent Bridge Test against New Zealand.

He spent two close seasons representing the South African teams Natal and Northern Transvaal in the Currie Cup. He remained popular with his team-mates but a short-lived move to Gloucestershire in 1988 was cut short when he was forced to retire through multiple sclerosis aged 29. He became an active fundraiser for the charity for the rest of his life. He died from complications arising from the disease in July 2012 aged 53. He left a widow Louise and four children.

External links
Former Surrey and Gloucestershire all-rounder David Thomas dies aged 53
ESPNcricinfo
CricketArchive

1959 births
2012 deaths
Neurological disease deaths in England
Deaths from multiple sclerosis
Sportspeople from Solihull
English cricketers
Gloucestershire cricketers
Marylebone Cricket Club cricketers
KwaZulu-Natal cricketers
Northerns cricketers
Surrey cricketers
D. H. Robins' XI cricketers